Donovan Jamal McNabb (born November 25, 1976) is an American former football quarterback who played in the National Football League (NFL) for 13 seasons, primarily with the Philadelphia Eagles. He played college football at Syracuse University and was selected second overall in the 1999 NFL Draft by the Eagles, where he spent 11 seasons. McNabb also spent a year each with the Washington Redskins and Minnesota Vikings. He was inducted to the Philadelphia Eagles Hall of Fame in 2013.

As the Eagles' starting quarterback from 1999 to 2009, McNabb led the team to eight playoff appearances (including five consecutive from 2000 to 2004), five division titles (including four consecutive from 2001 to 2004), five NFC Championship Games (including four consecutive from 2001 to 2004), and one Super Bowl appearance in Super Bowl XXXIX. McNabb ranks eighth in quarterback rushing yards and was the fourth NFL quarterback to amass over 30,000 passing yards, 200 touchdown passes, 3,000 rushing yards, and 20 rushing touchdowns. He is also the Eagles' franchise leader in passing yards, passing touchdowns, attempts, and completions.

Early years
McNabb was born and raised in Chicago, Illinois. He attended Mount Carmel High School, where as a sophomore, he was a teammate of future NFL players Simeon Rice and Matt Cushing. Together, they helped Mount Carmel win the 1991 State Championship over Wheaton Central High School. As a senior, he led the team to a Chicago Prep Bowl championship. He also excelled at track and field, and played basketball with Antoine Walker.

College career
Though McNabb was approached by recruiters from numerous colleges, only two schools, Syracuse University and the University of Nebraska, offered him scholarships to play college football as a quarterback. He initially leaned toward attending Nebraska, as he relished the idea of being coached by Tom Osborne. Eventually, however, he decided to attend Syracuse and play for the Syracuse Orange football team, principally because he wanted to prove he was a competent "pocket passer", but also for their broadcasting journalism program.

After redshirting in 1994, his first year at Syracuse, McNabb went on to start every game during his college career, compiling a 35–14 record. As a freshman, he completed the longest touchdown pass in Syracuse's history—a 96-yard throw against West Virginia University—in a game where he accounted for 354 total yards of offense; he was named the Big East Conference's rookie of the year at the end of the season. McNabb amassed 2,892 yards of total offense in his junior season to set a school record. As a senior, he led Syracuse to a berth in the Orange Bowl against Florida, as he completed 157 of 251 passes (62.5%) for 2,134 yards; he also pushed the eventual champions, the Tennessee Volunteers, to the limit in a very close game. His 22 touchdown passes tied the school's single-season record, set by former Eagle Don McPherson in 1987. McNabb also rushed 135 times for 438 yards and eight touchdowns. He ranked sixth in the nation with a 158.9 passing efficiency rating and 22nd in total offense, with 233.8 yards per game. He tied a school record with four touchdown passes against Cincinnati, and scored five touchdowns against Miami (three rushing and two passing). McNabb was also teammates with future NFL star Marvin Harrison for one season at Syracuse.

McNabb was named the Big East's offensive player of the decade for the 1990s, and Big East Offensive Player of the Year three times from 1996 to 1998, as well as the first-team all-conference vote earner in each of his four seasons. He was a finalist for the 1998 Heisman Trophy. Later, he was named to the Syracuse All-Century football team.

McNabb was also a walk-on for two seasons for the Syracuse basketball team under head coach Jim Boeheim. He spent two years as a reserve on the school's nationally ranked basketball team, including the 1996 squad that lost to Kentucky (a team led by his former high-school teammate Antoine Walker) in the National Championship game.

Statistics

Football statistics

Big East records
 2nd – touchdown passes (77)
 2nd – touchdowns responsible for (96) behind Pat White
 5th – passing yards (8,389)
 3rd – total offensive yards (9,950) behind Matt Grothe and Pat White
 1st – total offensive plays (1,403)

Syracuse University records
 1st – total yards per game (221.1)
 1st – passing efficiency (155.1)
 1st – yards per attempt (9.1)

Basketball statistics

Source:

Professional career

Philadelphia Eagles

1999: Rookie season
McNabb was drafted in the first round as the second overall pick by the Eagles, behind first pick Tim Couch, in the 1999 NFL Draft. A group of Eagles fans known as the "Dirty 30" were sent to the draft by sports radio host Angelo Cataldi and Philadelphia Mayor Ed Rendell. The two believed the Eagles would select running back Ricky Williams and they wanted the fans to cheer the selection. However, when the Eagles selected McNabb the "Dirty 30" ended up loudly booing McNabb when he appeared on stage. McNabb was the second of five quarterbacks selected in the first 12 picks of a quarterback-rich class that was at that point considered the best quarterback draft since the famous class of 1983. However, only McNabb and Daunte Culpepper went on to have successful careers in the NFL; Tim Couch struggled with the Cleveland Browns and officially retired in 2007 after being cut by the Jacksonville Jaguars in a failed comeback bid, while Akili Smith and Cade McNown were out of the NFL by 2002. By 2006, only McNabb was still with the team that originally drafted him.

McNabb saw his first NFL regular-season action in the second half against the Tampa Bay Buccaneers in a 19–5 home loss on September 19. He made his first career start at home against Washington on November 14, completing eight of 21 passes for 60 yards in a 35–28 win. He also had nine carries for 49 rushing yards and led the team to a pair of successful two-point conversions (one rush and one pass). He was the first Eagles rookie to start at quarterback since Brad Goebel, and the first Eagles rookie draft pick to start since John Reaves in 1972. With the win, McNabb became the first Eagles rookie quarterback to win his first NFL start since Mike Boryla (December 1, 1974, against Green Bay) and the first Eagle quarterback to win his first start since Ty Detmer (October 13, 1996, against the New York Giants).

McNabb threw the first touchdown pass of his career (six yards to tight end Chad Lewis) against the Indianapolis Colts in a 44–17 home loss on November 21, 1999. McNabb went on to start six of the Eagles' final seven contests (missing the December 19 home game against the New England Patriots, a 24–9 victory, due to injury).

2000–2003: NFC East championship runs

In his first full season as an NFL starter in 2000, McNabb finished second in the Associated Press MVP voting (24-11) to St. Louis Rams running back Marshall Faulk, who set the NFL record for most touchdowns scored in a season. McNabb made his primetime debut on ESPN against the Atlanta Falcons at home on October 1, with his first 300-yard passing game in a 38–10 victory and the Eagles' first 300-yard passer since Bobby Hoying against the Cincinnati Bengals at home on November 30, 1997. McNabb's 55 pass attempts at Pittsburgh in a come-from-behind 26–23 overtime victory on November 12 were then a career high and tied for the fourth-highest total in team history. He was named the NFC Offensive Player of the Week after accounting for 90.7% of the offense in a 23–20 victory at Washington on November 26. His 125 rushing yards were the most by an NFL quarterback since the Chicago Bears' Bobby Douglass rushed for 127 on December 17, 1972, and was the eighth-best rushing effort by a quarterback since 1940 when the T formation was introduced. He threw a career-high 390 passing yards and four touchdowns in a 35–24 victory at the Cleveland Browns on December 10 en route to his second NFC Offensive Player of the Week award. McNabb led the Eagles to their first playoff appearance since 1996, where they defeated the favored Tampa Bay Buccaneers 21–3 before losing to the New York Giants 20–10.

McNabb was selected as a first alternate to the NFC Pro Bowl squad in 2000 (behind Daunte Culpepper, Jeff Garcia, and Kurt Warner). When Warner was unable to participate due to injury, McNabb took his spot and led the NFC on a touchdown-scoring drive in his first series. He accounted for 74.6% of the team's total net yards in 2000, third highest in the NFL. Only Carolina's Steve Beuerlein (75.3%) and San Francisco's Garcia (75.1%) had a higher percentage. His 629 rushing yards in 2000 led the Eagles, made McNabb only the third quarterback since 1970 to lead his team in rushing, and at the time was the fourth-highest season rushing total by a quarterback (968 by Bobby Douglass in 1972, 942 by Randall Cunningham in 1990, and 674 by Steve McNair in 1997). His six rushing touchdowns in 2000 were the most by an Eagles quarterback since Randall Cunningham, who also had six in 1988. McNabb broke the club's single-season record for most attempts (569) and completions (330) in 2000, marks previously set by Cunningham (560 and 301, respectively) in 1988. He was named 2000 NFL Player of the Year by CBS Radio and the Terry (Bradshaw) Awards on Fox Sports and was named to the All-Madden team.

In 2001, McNabb led the Eagles to an 11–5 season and fourth-quarter comebacks in two wins against the defending NFC champion New York Giants. At the Meadowlands on October 22, his 18-yard pass to James Thrash with 1:52 remaining gave the Eagles a 10–9 victory, and their first win over the Giants in ten games. He also wiped out a 21–14 deficit on December 30, engineering two fourth-quarter scores as the Eagles clinched their first NFC East title in thirteen years with a 24–21 win. He was named NFL Offensive Player of the Week after the NFC Divisional Playoff game against the Chicago Bears on January 19, 2002, completing 26-of-40 for 262 yards and two touchdowns passing and adding 37 yards and a touchdown on the ground, which was also the final touchdown at the old Soldier Field. He became only the fourth quarterback in Eagles history to pass for 3,000 yards in consecutive seasons – Sonny Jurgensen (1961–62), Ron Jaworski (1980–81), and Randall Cunningham (1988–90) were the others. McNabb's Eagles advanced to the NFC championship game for the first time since 1980, losing to the heavily favored St. Louis Rams.

McNabb earned his second trip to the Pro Bowl (was originally elected as an alternate) following the 2001 season after combining for 3,715 yards of total offense and establishing career highs in touchdown passes (25) and quarterback rating (84.3). Including the playoffs, he threw touchdown passes in 15 of 18 games and two-or-more in 12 of those games. He was named by his teammates as the club's offensive MVP in 2000 and 2001. During the off-season, McNabb signed a new contract with the Eagles worth $115 million over 12 years, with a $20.5 million signing bonus.

In 2002, McNabb was named NFC Offensive Player of the Month for September, his first time receiving that award.  During that month, McNabb led the Eagles to a franchise-record 140 points through four games. In that span, he accounted for 71.5 percent of the club's offensive production, and completed 92 of 150 passes for 1,050 yards and nine touchdowns with three interceptions for a 92.2 passer rating. He also rushed for 141 yards and two touchdowns. In week 11 of the 2002 season, McNabb suffered a broken fibula. On the third play of the game against the Arizona Cardinals, he was sacked by the Cardinals' Adrian Wilson and LeVar Woods. He fumbled the ball, fell to the ground, and held his right leg. He went to the locker room to have his ankle taped, but returned for the Eagles' second drive. His injury was reported to be a sprained ankle, but X-rays after the game revealed that McNabb had broken his fibula in three places. During the game, however, he was 20-of-25 passing, with 255 yards and four touchdowns. McNabb was out for the last six weeks of the regular season. A dominant defense helped A. J. Feeley and Koy Detmer go a combined 5–1 to finish the season. McNabb returned to face the Atlanta Falcons in the playoffs, but he recovered slowly. The Eagles defeated the Falcons 20–6, but were upset at home by the Tampa Bay Buccaneers 27–10 in the NFC championship game. Following the injury, McNabb's willingness to run decreased, and his rushing statistics never matched the high standards set in his first four years. However, this was not a detriment to McNabb or the Eagles, as McNabb's offensive output increased in the years after his fourth season.

In late September 2003, McNabb was the subject of very controversial comments made by Rush Limbaugh, who worked as a commentator for ESPN at the time, stating that McNabb was overrated, and that, "I think what we've had here is a little social concern in the NFL. The media has been very desirous that a black quarterback do well". The comments came after the Eagles began the season 0–2, losing to defending Super Bowl champion Buccaneers and eventual champion New England, both losses coming in their newly opened stadium, Lincoln Financial Field. Many responses from commentators, football players, coaches, and other public figures were sharply critical of Limbaugh. Limbaugh resigned from ESPN within days, and the long-term implications of the remarks were revisited in 2021 after Limbaugh's death from lung cancer.

Despite the slow beginning in the 2003 season, McNabb again led his team to the NFC championship game, highlighted by the Eagles' comeback win against the Green Bay Packers in the divisional playoff round. The NFL would later place this game at #69 on its list of 100 greatest games in the first 100 years of NFL history. McNabb became the first quarterback to rush for more than 100 yards in a postseason game, surpassing the previous record which Otto Graham held for over 50 years. He also completed the critical 4th and 26 pass to Freddie Mitchell during the game-tying drive at the end of regulation. Later analysis published in 2012 by Advanced Football Analytics and the Journal of Quantitative Analysis in Sports determined that the Eagles’ odds of tying the score under those conditions was “a whopping 1 out of 175." 

Although the slow start hindered his overall statistics for 2003, McNabb had the highest quarterback rating (97.5) in the NFL for the second half of the season and also completed over 62% of his passes for over eight yards per attempt. With Philadelphia's 14–3 home loss to the underdog Carolina Panthers in the 2003 NFC championship game, McNabb joined Ken Stabler of the Oakland Raiders (1973–1975) and Danny White of the Dallas Cowboys (1980–1982) as the only quarterbacks to lead a team to defeats in conference title games for three consecutive seasons, prompting some observers to conclude that McNabb "chokes" in big games (his cumulative passer rating in the three conference championship games was 50.5 - a figure about 10 points lower than what the worst quarterback in the league earns over the course of a typical year). McNabb was knocked out of the NFC title game after being hit on the ground by Panthers' linebacker Greg Favors after he had been tripped up on a broken play.

The Eagles’ successes from 2000 to 2003 came despite McNabb having only one receiving target who appeared in the Pro Bowl during that time, TE Chad Lewis. The Eagles also arguably had a starting wide receiver corps among the league's worst over that period. In 2003, Philadelphia's wide receivers caught only five touchdown passes, tying the record for fewest in a 16-game season. By going the entire months of September and October without having a wide receiver catch a touchdown pass, the 2003 Eagles became the first NFL team since 1945 not to have gotten a touchdown pass from any of its wide receivers in the first two months of a season.

2004: Super Bowl XXXIX

McNabb finally amassed the kind of numbers that placed him firmly as one of the elite NFL quarterbacks statistically. He averaged 8.26 yards per attempt, completed 64.0% of his passes, threw 31 touchdown passes (he also ran for three more), and had only eight interceptions. These numbers translated to a passer rating of 104.7. Further, he became the first quarterback in league history to throw over 30 touchdowns and fewer than 10 interceptions in a single season. This dramatic improvement coincided with a massive upgrading of the Eagles' receiving corps, namely the arrival of Terrell Owens, who caught 77 passes for 1,200 yards and 14 touchdowns in only 14 games. As a result, the Eagles won their first seven games of the season for the first time in franchise history, clinched first place in their division with five weeks still to play in the regular season (becoming only the third team in modern NFL history to do this), and won the NFC East by a record-tying seven-game margin in posting a 13–3 record, the franchise's best 16-game season ever.

McNabb's finest moment of the season and of his career came that year in a week-13 game with fellow Super Bowl-contending Green Bay Packers. After starting the game completing his first 14 passes (an NFL record), he led the Eagles to a 47-17 blowout victory. McNabb passed for an Eagles' record 464 yards and five touchdowns, which all came in the first half. In 2010, it was ranked number one by Eagles fans as the "game of the decade".

In the playoffs, McNabb led the Eagles to their second Super Bowl trip ever, with victories over the Minnesota Vikings 27-14 and Atlanta Falcons 27-10 in the NFC Championship. Owens was not in the lineup during the two playoff victories, and was recovering from a broken ankle. McNabb became only the third African-American quarterback to start in a Super Bowl after Doug Williams in 1987 and Steve McNair in 1999.

McNabb led his team against the New England Patriots in Super Bowl XXXIX. McNabb struggled at times as the Patriots' defense stifled the Eagles’ running attack, limiting the team to only 45 yards rushing. Almost half of those yards were gained on a 22-yard run by Brian Westbrook as time expired at the end of the first half, and the Eagles ballcarriers averaged less than 1.5 yards per rush (23 yards on 16 carries) during the rest of the game. The Eagles' receiving corps was also depleted, as TE Chad Lewis missed the game due to injury, and WR Todd Pinkston was forced to leave the game due to dehydration after catching four passes in the first half for 82 yards. McNabb threw three crucial interceptions, two of which were thrown in New England territory, and one of those two was inside the 20-yard line. The final interception was during a last-gasp Hail Mary at the end of the game. He was also sacked four times. Controversy surrounded the end of the game, as center Hank Fraley claimed that McNabb was seriously ill. Wide receiver Freddie Mitchell claimed that he had to call a few plays due to McNabb's illness. However, in an interview with NBC, McNabb said he was not sick and did not throw up. He just said he was tired. Some reports claim that McNabb had the wind knocked out of him by an earlier hit, while others assert that he was unduly fatigued (McNabb also suffered from a bout of nausea at the conclusion of a 2002 regular-season game played at Alltel Stadium, where Super Bowl XXXIX was contested). An article written by a staff member of The Philadelphia Inquirer refuted allegations of McNabb throwing up during the Super Bowl and even labeled the alleged incident "a myth". Both head coach Andy Reid and McNabb have denied any physical problems that led to the puzzlingly slow pace of play. Despite all of the problems, McNabb finished the game with 30 completions for 357 yards, the third-highest total for both categories in Super Bowl history, and three touchdowns, the only points in the game for Philadelphia. Despite McNabb's efforts, the Eagles lost by a score of 24–21.

2005–2007: Injuries
McNabb's 2005 season began in turmoil and ended on the injured reserve list. While not speaking to his main target, Terrell Owens, and all the distractions that came with the Owens controversy, McNabb performed well in September and was named the NFC's Offensive Player of the Month for the fourth time. That month, McNabb threw 964 yards, eight touchdowns, and only two interceptions in three games, leading the Eagles to a 2–1 record. McNabb carried that momentum into October as he went 33-for-48 (68.8% completions), and threw 369 yards and three touchdowns en route to leading the Eagles to a memorable come-from-behind victory at an unfriendly Arrowhead Stadium against the Kansas City Chiefs. McNabb could not keep the momentum rolling, however, as the Eagles lost four straight games. Over that span, McNabb posted a passer rating higher than 72 only once, on November 6, at the Washington Redskins. After playing with a sports hernia and sore thumb, McNabb's season was finally over after a disastrous effort at home on November 14 on Monday night against the rival Dallas Cowboys. McNabb was intercepted by Roy Williams towards the end of the game, and tried to tackle the defender when Scott Shanle came in and tackled McNabb to the ground. McNabb had injured his groin on the play and was placed on the injured-reserve list later that week. Mike McMahon replaced him at quarterback, and went 2–5 as a starter, with the Eagles finishing the season with a 6–10 record overall. Though low for his standards, McNabb put up respectable numbers in 2005. In nine games, he threw 2,507 yards, 16 touchdowns, and 9 interceptions. To go along with that, he completed 59.1% (211-357) of his passes. Prior to his season-ending injury, McNabb was on pace to throw 4,457 yards, which would have easily eclipsed his career high of 3,875, set in 2004.

McNabb and the Eagles began the 2006 season at 4-1 before stumbling to 5-4 heading into a week-11 game with Tennessee Titans on November 19. During the game, McNabb tore the anterior cruciate ligament (ACL) and meniscus in his right knee while jumping out of bounds, ending his season, the third time in five years McNabb had gone down with six or more games remaining in the regular season. Eagles officials stated that his rehabilitation would likely last 8–12 months, which completely ended his 2006 season and even raised questions as to whether he would be ready to begin playing by the beginning of the 2007 season. In the meantime, veteran backup quarterback Jeff Garcia took McNabb's place as the Eagles' starting quarterback. Garcia had success, leading the Eagles from 5-5 after the Tennessee game to 10-6 and winners of the NFC East Division. The Eagles went on to win their home playoff game in the wild card round of the playoffs against the New York Giants, 23–20, with Garcia under center. However, in the following divisional round, they were defeated by the New Orleans Saints in the Superdome, 27–24.

Having played nearly up to full speed in the preseason games, it was decided that McNabb would return to the field several months short of the full year-long recovery expected of an ACL injury. In the season opener against the Green Bay Packers, the Eagles and McNabb suffered a 16–13 loss. McNabb had his share of problems, completing less than half of his passes for 184 yards and one touchdown. The Eagles lost their first home game of the season to the rival Washington Redskins, 20–12, though his numbers improved. As week 3 approached, skeptics had already wondered whether McNabb still had the skill that propelled him to success in the past. The Eagles defeated the Detroit Lions in a 56–21 win in week 3. McNabb completed 21 of his 26 attempted passes for 381 yards. Four of those passes went for touchdowns (three of them went to Kevin Curtis), all in the first half. He was 14 of 15 for 332 yards in the first half. His performance against the Lions was highlighted by his first perfect (158.3) quarterback rating game. However, week 4 did not prove to be as good as the Eagles thought it would be. The Eagles endured yet another loss, this time to the New York Giants. The Giants' defense, led by defensive end Osi Umenyiora, sacked McNabb a record-tying 12 times. McNabb completed 15 of 31 attempted passes for 138 yards and no touchdowns.

During a win against the Cowboys, sideline reporter Pam Oliver reported during the game that McNabb indicated that he did not expect to be back in Philadelphia for the 2008 season. McNabb later indicated that this was not true, and stated that although he believed rookie Kevin Kolb's time would come, he would be an Eagle the next season.

2008

At the conclusion of the 2007 season, McNabb faced criticism for asking for "playmakers" on his yardbarker blog. He did, however, deny he was taking a shot at anyone in particular, saying "We were 8–8. There is room for improvement."

McNabb caused another mild stir in camp when he suggested that the Eagles should not have lost a game to any of their NFC East opponents the previous season. He felt that they were just a few plays away from being a playoff team. He even went on to say, "I still put us at the top of the NFC." In week 1 of the 2008 NFL season, McNabb threw for 361 yards (the most of any quarterback that week) and three touchdowns, which included a 90-yard toss to Hank Baskett at the end of the second quarter. This performance led to him receiving the FedEx Air Player of the Week award. In week 3 against the Pittsburgh Steelers, McNabb threw his 176th career touchdown, passing Ron Jaworski and becoming the Eagles' all-time touchdown-pass leader.

McNabb set a career high with 58 passing attempts (completing 28), and tied a career high with three interceptions in the NFL's first tie game in six years, when the Eagles played the Cincinnati Bengals and ended up with a 13–13 tie. McNabb later admitted that he was not aware that an NFL regular-season game could end in a tie, leading to controversy because this could have affected game strategy. After the game, he stated "I never even knew that was in the rulebook. It's part of the rules, and we have to go with it. I was looking forward to the next opportunity to get out there and try to win the game. I hate to see what happens in the Super Bowl, and I hate to see what happens in the playoffs, to settle with a tie."

After the tie, McNabb struggled in a game against the Baltimore Ravens, going 8-of-18 for 54 yards with two interceptions and a fumble, and being sacked twice. In the second half, Andy Reid decided to go with Kevin Kolb, who was in his second year in the league. This was McNabb's first time being benched for something other than injury or a meaningless game. In the game, Kolb threw an interception that was returned 108 yards for a touchdown by safety Ed Reed, breaking the record he previously held for longest interception returned for a touchdown.

Despite his up-and-down season, McNabb helped the Eagles reach the playoffs for the seventh time in his nine seasons as a starter. He also set a career high with 3,916 yards passing and led the Eagles to a franchise-record 416 points.

In the wild card round, McNabb threw 300 yards, including a 71-yard touchdown to Brian Westbrook, to lead Philadelphia to a 26–14 win over the Minnesota Vikings.

On January 11, 2009, McNabb led the Eagles past the defending champions, the New York Giants, in the divisional round of the playoffs. The Eagles won 23–11 and advanced to the NFC Championship game against the Arizona Cardinals, whom they defeated earlier in the season. In the game, McNabb was penalized for unsportsmanlike conduct, when after being tackled into the Giants' sideline after a lengthy run, he picked up the Giants' coaching phone in jest. The Eagles lost the game, giving McNabb a 1-4 record in conference championships, matching Ken Stabler with the lowest winning percentage in conference championships for a quarterback who has won it. This would later be matched by Green Bay Packers quarterback Aaron Rodgers in 2021, when he lost his fourth straight conference championship after winning his first trip to the game in 2010.

2009
In the 2009 NFL Draft, the Eagles picked Missouri Tigers star wide receiver Jeremy Maclin to add to McNabb's receiving corps, with Kevin Curtis and DeSean Jackson. While Curtis only caught 77 yards, Maclin had 773 yards and four touchdowns in a respectable rookie season, while Desean Jackson had his first 1,000-yard season. Another reliable target for McNabb was the new starting tight end Brent Celek, with whom he connected 76 times for 971 yards and eight touchdowns.

McNabb also encouraged the Eagles to sign quarterback Michael Vick to the team as a backup upon his release from prison for his part in a criminal dog fighting operation. McNabb stated that he was excited that the Eagles gave Vick an opportunity to get his life back on track, and The New York Times described McNabb's role in Vick's signing as “an act of selflessness not often seen among professional athletes.”

In the season opener, McNabb led the Eagles to a 38–10 win over the Carolina Panthers. He completed 10 of his 18 passes for a total of 79 yards and two touchdowns. However, Andy Reid said the following Monday that McNabb broke a rib while rushing for a touchdown in the third quarter. The Eagles were hopeful McNabb would start in the week-2 game against the New Orleans Saints, but he was kept on the sidelines in both weeks 2 and 3. Kevin Kolb replaced him, and the Eagles lost to the Saints, but beat the Kansas City Chiefs the next week. Following the Eagles bye week in week 4, McNabb returned in the week-5 game against the Tampa Bay Buccaneers, completing 16 of his 21 attempts for 264 yards and three touchdowns and being responsible for 210 of the 219 yards that the Eagles offense managed in total in the first half.

McNabb reached 200 career touchdowns and 30,000 career yards passed in a win against the Washington Redskins on October 26, 2009 with a 45-yard touchdown pass to DeSean Jackson.

Philadelphia met the Dallas Cowboys in week 16 with the winner becoming the NFC East champions. Philadelphia lost in a shutout by Dallas, setting up a rematch the following week in Dallas in the wild card playoff game.

The wild card rematch with Dallas proved to be just as disastrous, if not worse. McNabb struggled early on and was unable to get the offense into a rhythm until too late. His lone score came in the second half from a meaningless touchdown to DeSean Jackson. Philadelphia fell 34–14 to Dallas, marking the first time McNabb had ever lost a first-round playoff game. Despite having had arguably one of his best seasons statistically in 2009, McNabb began to face criticism and speculation about his future with the Eagles. McNabb was given Pro Bowl honors for the last time in his career. McNabb was 3 of 10 for 78 yards and one touchdown to DeSean Jackson, while also leading the NFC team in rushing with four carries for 26 yards.

Washington Redskins
In the press conference following the Eagles' loss to Dallas, and even up to April 1, Andy Reid stated that McNabb would remain the starting quarterback in Philadelphia for the 2010 season. However, on April 4, the Eagles traded McNabb to the Washington Redskins in return for a second-round (37th overall) pick in the 2010 NFL draft and a conditional third- or fourth-round pick in the 2011 NFL draft. The conditional pick became a fourth-round pick in 2011, which was traded to the Tampa Bay Buccaneers in exchange for a lower fourth-round pick in 2011 and a fourth-round pick in 2012. The fourth-round pick in 2012 was then traded, along with a 2012 third-round pick, to the Houston Texans for a lower 2012 third-round pick, which would be used to select quarterback Nick Foles and linebacker DeMeco Ryans.

In the first week of the 2010 season, McNabb and head coach Mike Shanahan led the Redskins to victory over the Dallas Cowboys. In week 2, McNabb nearly engineered a victory over the Houston Texans, passing for 426 yards (third-most of his career), but came up just short of a victory when the Texans prevailed 30–27 in overtime. In week 4, on October 3, McNabb played against the Eagles for the first time, returning with the Redskins to Lincoln Financial Field in Philadelphia. Although McNabb posted only pedestrian statistics, the Redskins won 17–12. During pregame introductions, McNabb received a standing ovation from Eagles fans, then hugged former coach Andy Reid at their postgame handshake.

In week 5, McNabb struggled for the first three quarters, but rallied the Redskins to a 16–13 overtime victory against the eventual-Super Bowl champion Green Bay Packers at FedExField. He was 26-49 for 357 yards with one touchdown and one interception. In week 6, McNabb was 29-45 for 246 yards. He threw one touchdown and was intercepted twice, with the second interception coming on fourth down in the last minute of the fourth quarter against the visiting Indianapolis Colts. The Redskins fell to the Colts 27–24. McNabb's passer rating was 67.5.

In week 8, Shanahan stated in a press conference that McNabb would remain the Redskins' starting quarterback. On November 15, 2010, McNabb signed a five-year extension worth $78 million ($3.5 million guaranteed) with a chance to make it $88 million by completing incentives. The deal stated that if McNabb was not cut or traded at the conclusion of the 2010 season, he would receive a $10 million bonus. The same day, his Redskins suffered a 59–28 defeat by his former team, the Eagles, at home on Monday Night Football. McNabb finished the game going 17 of 31 for 295 yards with two touchdowns and three interceptions.

On December 17, 2010, head coach Mike Shanahan relegated McNabb to the third quarterback position for the rest of this season, stating that he wanted to evaluate backup Rex Grossman in game play.

McNabb had perhaps one of the worst years of his career since 1999, going down in touchdowns and up in interceptions. However, at the time McNabb was demoted to third string, he was on pace to total 4,156 passing yards for the season, which would have broken the Redskins' all-time franchise record, and been the first time he had exceeded the 4,000-yard mark in his career.

Minnesota Vikings
On July 27, 2011, the Washington Redskins and the Minnesota Vikings came to an agreement on terms for a trade. After restructuring his contract, Washington traded McNabb to Minnesota in exchange for a sixth-round draft pick in 2012 and a conditional sixth-round draft pick in 2013. McNabb was rumored to be a possible addition to the Vikings for the past three years, in part due to his relationship with then-coach Brad Childress, the former Eagles offensive coordinator. Vikings punter Chris Kluwe agreed to give McNabb his number 5 jersey, in exchange for a $5,000 donation to Kick for a Cure, McNabb to promote Kluwe's band "Tripping Icarus" during a press conference, and an ice cream cone.

After starting the 2011 season with a 1–5 record, on October 18, it was announced that McNabb would no longer be the starting quarterback for the Vikings, as the job was given to rookie Christian Ponder for the remainder of the season.

McNabb requested and was granted his release from the team on December 1, 2011, with a reported interest in joining the Houston Texans, Kansas City Chiefs, or his hometown Chicago Bears, all three of which lost their starting quarterbacks for the season to injury, but were still making playoff pushes. While the Texans and Chiefs signed Jake Delhomme and Kyle Orton, respectively, prior to McNabb becoming a free agent, the Bears did not sign anyone and expressed interest in adding McNabb. It was ultimately decided that it was too late to add a free-agent quarterback for the playoff hunt, as it would be tough to grasp their offense in the short period of time. The Bears subsequently signed Josh McCown.

On July 29, 2013, McNabb officially retired from professional football as a member of the Philadelphia Eagles.

NFL career statistics

 Totaled 3,341 yards on 587 carries and 28 touchdowns rushing in his career, along with 362 yards on 63 attempts and three touchdowns in the playoffs.
 Seasons in top 5 (Bold = Led NFL): 
 Pass Completions: 2000, 2008
 Total TDs: 2004
 Total TDs Per Game: 2002, 2004, 2005, 2006
 Passer Rating: 2004, 2006
 Total Offense Per Game:  2002, 2005, 2006
 Yards Per Attempt: 2004, 2006
 Yards Per Completion: 2004, 2006, 2009
 Interception %: 2001, 2002, 2003, 2004, 2006, 2007
 TD %: 2001, 2004, 2006
 Game Winning Drives: 2003

Accomplishments
McNabb's accomplishments and career rankings include:
 Led NFL in QB wins from 2000 to 2004. Ranked fourth in QB wins during his 13-year career behind Peyton Manning, Tom Brady, and Brett Favre.
 Third quarterback since 1970 to lead his team in rushing in a season (2000).
 As of the 2010 season, ranked fourth-best all-time in career interception percentage (2.20%) among NFL quarterbacks. Among quarterbacks with at least 1,500 pass attempts, only Aaron Rodgers (1.99%), Neil O'Donnell (2.11%), and Tom Brady (2.19%) have lower career interception percentages than McNabb.
 As of the 2020 season:
 Nine postseason wins tied for 12th-most among quarterbacks.
 McNabb's regular season and postseason quarterback wins (107) and win percentage (0.607) both placed 17th among quarterbacks since 1970 (minimum 130 games started). Only ten quarterbacks placed higher in both categories.
 Six Pro Bowl appearances tie for 5th-most in Eagles history, and are tied for 19th all-time among NFL quarterbacks.
 Led the Eagles to five conference championship games. Tied for 6th-most in the Super Bowl era, and tied for 3rd-most in the NFC Championship Game.
 Total touchdowns per game, interceptions per game, and career touchdown-to-interception ratio ranked 24th, 16th, and 10th respectively (minimum 3000 attempts). 
 Postseason passing touchdowns, total offensive yards, and pass completions ranked 14th (tied), 12th, and 10th respectively.

NFL records
 First NFL quarterback to throw more than 30 touchdowns and less than 10 interceptions in a season (2004)
 Tied with Jim Kelly for the most playoff wins by a quarterback who did not win the Super Bowl (9). John Elway holds the record for most playoff wins by a quarterback before eventually winning his first Super Bowl, with 10.
 Tied with Troy Aikman for most consecutive appearances in the NFC Championship Game by a quarterback (4). Tom Brady holds the overall record, having led the New England Patriots to eight consecutive AFC Championship Game appearances.
 Records formerly held by McNabb include:
 Most consecutive pass attempts completed, with 24 over two games in 2004 against the New York Giants (his final 10 passes on November 28, 2004) and Green Bay Packers (his first 14 passes on December 5, 2004), until Ryan Tannehill broke this record on October 25, 2015, with 25 consecutive passes completed over two games. Mark Brunell and David Carr hold the record for most consecutive completed passes in a single game with 22. McNabb also completed 25 consecutive passes against the San Diego Chargers on October 23, 2005, but this record is not counted by the NFL as it included a spiking of the ball to stop the clock at the end of the half. The 2005 game was also noteworthy for Coach Reid calling for McNabb to have 25 pass attempts in a row, without interruption by a running play.
 Most rushing yards by a quarterback in a postseason game, with 107 yards on January 11, 2004, against the Green Bay Packers. This was also the first time that an NFL quarterback surpassed 100 yards rushing in a postseason game. The previous record was 99 yards, set by Otto Graham in 1950. This record has been surpassed several times since, and is currently held by Colin Kaepernick, with 186 yards rushing against the Green Bay Packers on January 12, 2013. With this performance, McNabb also became the first quarterback to throw for 200 yards and rush for 100 yards in a postseason game.

Broadcasting career
In September 2012, McNabb joined the NFL Network as an analyst. In 2013, McNabb became an analyst on Fox Sports Live, Fox Sports 1's flagship program, and in August 2014, it was announced that McNabb would provide color commentary alongside Dick Stockton for a few games during the 2014 NFL season for Fox. He resigned from Fox in late 2015. In August 2016, McNabb became the lead analyst for beIN Sports college football coverage, and he also joined ESPN Radio as an analyst.

On December 12, 2017, McNabb was suspended by ESPN as the organization investigated allegations of sexual harassment when he worked at NFL Network. In January 2018, McNabb and fellow football analyst Eric Davis were officially fired from the network.

McNabb and his mother Wilma McNabb have done commercials for Campbell's Chunky Soup, which have been parodied on Saturday Night Live.

Personal life
McNabb married his college sweetheart, Raquel Ann Sarah "Roxie" Nurse, in June 2003. They have four children: daughter Alexis, who was born on September 23, 2004, twins Sariah and Donovan Jr., who were born in 2008, and Devin James, who was born in 2009. The family splits their time between homes in Moorestown, New Jersey and Chandler, Arizona.

In 2002, McNabb, who holds a Bachelor of Science degree in speech communication from Syracuse University, was named to the institution's board of trustees; he is one of the youngest trustees to have served there. McNabb currently is an athlete partner and serves on the advisory board for MODe Sports Nutrition.

McNabb also played basketball at Syracuse University as a reserve guard. In the 1996 NCAA Men's Division I Basketball Tournament national championship game against the University of Kentucky Wildcats, McNabb played against his former high-school teammate Antoine Walker.

McNabb is the brother-in-law of former Canadian Football League (CFL) player Richard Nurse. Through this marriage, McNabb is the uncle of Canadian ice hockey defenceman Darnell Nurse, who was the seventh overall pick by the Edmonton Oilers in the 2013 NHL Entry Draft, Kia Nurse, a professional basketball player for the Seattle Storm and the Canada women's national basketball team, and Sarah Nurse, who competed on Team Canada's national women's hockey team at the 2018 Winter Olympics and the 2022 Winter Olympics.

In April 2014, McNabb served a one-day jail sentence in Maricopa County, Arizona for a 2013 driving under the influence (DUI) conviction.

On June 28, 2015, McNabb was arrested for DUI following a traffic accident in Gilbert, Arizona. He pleaded guilty and was sentenced to 90 days, 18 to be served in jail and the remainder under house arrest. He was also assessed a $6,000 fine and required to do 30 hours of community service. He paid his fine and began serving his time on November 30, 2015. On December 18, McNabb was released from jail after having served an 18-day sentence, and then completed a 72-day house arrest sentence.

In 2000, McNabb started his own charity called the Donovan McNabb Fund to raise awareness about diabetes. The charity has raised hundreds of thousands of dollars for diabetes awareness.

See also
 List of NFL quarterbacks who have posted a perfect passer rating

References

External links

 
 Yardbarker Blog
 Minnesota Vikings bio

1976 births
Living people
African-American basketball players
African-American players of American football
American football quarterbacks
American men's basketball players
American philanthropists
Basketball players from Chicago
Basketball players from New Jersey
Basketball players from Philadelphia
Minnesota Vikings players
National Conference Pro Bowl players
National Football League announcers
National Football League players with retired numbers
Nurse family
People from Moorestown, New Jersey
Philadelphia Eagles players
Players of American football from Arizona
Players of American football from Chicago
Players of American football from New Jersey
Players of American football from Philadelphia
Sportspeople from Chandler, Arizona
Sportspeople from the Delaware Valley
Sportspeople from the Phoenix metropolitan area
Syracuse Orange football players
Syracuse Orange men's basketball players
Washington Redskins players